The Minister of Science, Technology, Energy and Mines was a cabinet minister position in the province of Manitoba, Canada.

The position was created in September 2006, and incorporated responsibilities from the former portfolios of Industry, Economic Development and Mines and Energy, Science and Technology. In November 2009, the portfolio was renamed Innovation, Energy and Mines. In October 2013, the functions of this department were redistributed between the Minister of Mineral Resources, the Minister of Jobs and the Economy, and the Minister of Municipal Government (Energy division).

List of Ministers

References

Energy ministers
Innovation, Energy and Mines, Minister of